Egeberg Castle a building in St. Hanshaugen in Oslo, Norway. Egeberg  was once Oslo's biggest private residence at 1600 square metres over two floors and a tower section. At the turn of the century, the a mansion stood tall surrounded by a big park and with a splendid view over the city and harbour.

Einar Westye Egeberg
Egeberg was constructed in 1899-1901 on the basis of designs by leading architect  Halfdan Berle  (1861- 1929). The mansion was constructed  on behalf of Einar Westye Egeberg (1851-1940) and his wife Birgitte Halvordine (1857-1930). Einar Westye Egeberg co-owned one of Oslo's most important lumber companies,  Westye Egeberg & Co . The Egeberg couple had seven children of which most had reached adulthood when the family moved into the a mansion in 1901.

Construction
The construction was done using quality materials such as granite and soapstone. The architectural style was Italian renaissance dominated by noble forms. The interior ceilings were made by Italian stucco workers. The first floor contained hall, vestibule, smoking lounge, dining room, kitchen, loggia, garden room and cabinet. In the second floor, there were bed rooms, dressing rooms and bath room. The tower held the billiard room whereas storage rooms were found in the basement. Mrs. Egeberg suffered from a weak health and was partially paralyzed. Therefore, a lift was installed at a cost of NOK 25,000. A car—an open Minerva similar to that of the Norwegian royal family—was acquired in 1912 for Mrs. Egeberg to be able go on a daily drive with the chauffeur. She died in 1930.

Later years
After his wife's death, Einar Egeberg did not want to live alone in the big residence, and thus wanted to sell it, which proved difficult during the 1930s economic depression. In the end, Egeberg  was sold to Bolig-Bygg AS.  Another two floors were added within the original building construction: one additional floor was created by splitting the second floor into two separate floors. The fourth floor came from converting the original loft surrounding the billiard room into living area. Thus, Egeberg  changed from a private residence to an apartment building with 24 apartments.

References

Castles in Norway
Buildings and structures in Oslo
Houses completed in 1901